Miuroglanis platycephalus is a species of catfish (order Siluriformes) of the family Trichomycteridae, and the only species of the genus Miuroglanis. This species is endemic to Brazil where it occurs in the Solimões River basin.  This species grows to a length of  NG.

References

Trichomycteridae
Fish of South America
Fish of Brazil
Fish of the Amazon basin
Endemic fauna of Brazil
Taxa named by Carl H. Eigenmann
Taxa named by Rosa Smith Eigenmann
Catfish genera
Monotypic freshwater fish genera